Joana Machado (born Joana Machado Neves on November 13, 1980, in Rio de Janeiro) is a Brazilian personal trainer, photographic model and reality television personality, best known for being the winner of the fourth season of the Brazilian version of The Farm.

Career
Joana Machado brought to media attention in 2008 following her on-and-off affair with football player Adriano, marked by scandals and mutual aggression. These headlines made her into a media personality.

Since then, she appeared on several television shows, magazine covers (which included a nude photoshoot for Sexxy magazine in March 2011) and other media.

A Fazenda
On July 19, 2011, Joana Machado was officially announced as one of the fifteen celebrities contestants on the fourth season of A Fazenda, the Brazilian version of reality series The Farm, which aired on Rede Record.

On October 12, 2011, after 87 days, she was crowned the winner of the season, beating TV host Monique Evans and sexual blogger Raquel Pacheco in the final vote, taking home the R$2 million prize.

On October 27, 2011, she became a cast member of Legendários, Marcos Mion Saturday night comedy show, where she currently works as a correspondent. Her first episode aired November 5, 2011.

Filmography

References

External links
Joana Machado Profile on R7.com

1980 births
Living people
People from Rio de Janeiro (city)
Brazilian female models
Reality show winners
The Farm (TV series) winners